Rajmund Csányi (born 22 April 1936) is a Hungarian gymnast. He competed at the 1960 Summer Olympics and the 1964 Summer Olympics.

References

1936 births
Living people
Hungarian male artistic gymnasts
Olympic gymnasts of Hungary
Gymnasts at the 1960 Summer Olympics
Gymnasts at the 1964 Summer Olympics
Sportspeople from Bucharest